Yogetor spiralis is a jumping spider species in the genus Yogetor that lives in Ethiopia. It was first described in 2008.

References

Endemic fauna of Ethiopia
Fauna of Ethiopia
Salticidae
Spiders described in 2008
Spiders of Africa
Taxa named by Wanda Wesołowska